The 1916 Tennessee Volunteers football team represented the University of Tennessee in the 1916 Southern Intercollegiate Athletic Association football season.  John R. Bender served his first season as head coach of the Volunteers.  Because of World War I, Tennessee  did not field another varsity squad until 1919.

The 1916 Vols won eight games and lost none.  The only blemish on Tennessee's record was a scoreless draw with Kentucky in the last game; and the Vols won a share of the Southern Intercollegiate Athletic Association title for the second time in three years — sharing the title with Georgia Tech.  This season also saw the first homecoming football game in Tennessee football history, hosting rival Vanderbilt, against  which Tennessee achieved a then-rare victory..

The New York Herald ranked quarterback Buck Hatcher as the season's premier punter. Captain and end Graham Vowell was the season's only unanimous All-Southern selection, and was a third-team All-America selection by Walter Camp. Next to him on the line was his older brother, Morris Vowell. Next to him was Chink Lowe. At the other end was Lloyd Wolfe.

Before the season
Coach Bender came to Tennessee from Kansas State, effectively switching jobs with former Volunteers head coach Zora G. Clevenger.  Bender ran a short punt system. In 1916, football used a one-platoon system in which players played both offense, defense, and special teams. Quarterback Buck Hatcher was a triple-threat.

Schedule

Season summary

Tusculum
The season opened with a 33–0 defeat of Tusculum.

Maryville
In the second week of play, Tennessee beat the Maryville Scots  32–0.

Clemson

Sources:

Tennessee beat Clemson 14–0, the game remaining 0–0 well into the fourth quarter. Eventually in the fourth, Tennessee drove to the 1-yard line and lost the ball on downs. After forcing Clemson to punt, Tennessee again found itself at the 1-yard line, and was penalized 5 yards. Clemson was also penalized 5 yards, and with the ball back at the 1-yard line the Volunteers scored the touchdown. The second touchdown came on an interception.

The starting lineup was G. Vowell (left end), M. Vowell (left tackle), Shoulders (left guard), Robinson (center), Lowe (right guard), Henderson (right tackle), Wolfe (right end), Luck (quarterback), Emery (left halfback), Shelby (right halfback), A. Hatcher (fullback).

South Carolina
The Volunteers defeated South Carolina 26–0.

Florida

Sources:

The Vols blanked the Florida Gators  in Tampa 24–0 in the two rivals first-ever meeting. Hatcher's punts were the feature of the contest.

The starting lineup was G. Vowell (left end), M. Vowell (left tackle), Lowe (left guard), Robinson (center), Shoulders (right guard), Hambaugh (right tackle), Wolfe (right end), A. Hatcher (quarterback), Shelby (left halfback), Emory (right halfback), Luck (fullback).

Chattanooga

Tennessee beat Chattanooga 12–7, the most points scored on the Vols all season.

Vanderbilt
Tennessee upset the Vanderbilt Commodores 10–6. Vanderbilt's lone score came on a 70-yard run by Rabbit Curry.  Graham Vowell scored  the  touchdown and Buck Hatcher kicked a field goal. Hatcher regularly outpunted Tom Zerfoss. Both ends, Vowell and Lloyd Wolfe, helped stop Curry.

The starting lineup was G. Vowell (left end), M. Vowell (left tackle), Lowe (left guard), Robinson (center), Henderson (right guard), Hambaugh (right tackle), Wolfe (right end), A. Hatcher (quarterback), Emory (left halfback), Twifford (right halfback), Ring (fullback).

Sewanee
The Volunteers beat the Sewanee Tigers 17–0. Morris Vowell had a 99-yard interception return.

Kentucky

Sources:

The season closed with an upset tie by the Kentucky Wildcats, an account of which reads "Rodes and McIlvain, Kentucky's quarterback and fullback, played a magnificent game and had they received the proper support from their team, would have piled up a large score against Tennessee."

The starting lineup was G. Vowell (left end), M. Vowell (left tackle), Lowe (left guard), Robinson (center), Henderson (right guard), Hambaugh (right tackle), Wolfe (right end), A. Hatcher (quarterback), Emory (left halfback), J. Luck (right halfback), Ring (fullback).

Postseason
The New York Herald ranked quarterback Buck Hatcher as the season's premier punter. Graham Vowell was the season's only unanimous All-Southern selection, and was a third-team All-America selection by Walter Camp.

Personnel

Depth chart

References

Additional sources
 

Tennessee
Tennessee Volunteers football seasons
College football undefeated seasons
Tennessee Volunteers football